Creed is a hamlet in mid Cornwall, England, United Kingdom. It is roughly midway between Truro and St Austell, about two miles (3 km) east of Probus.

Creed is in the civil parish of Grampound with Creed (where the population was included) and the name comes from Saint Cride (Sancta Crida), the patron of the church.

The manor of Tybesta was the head manor of the hundred of Powder in the time of Domesday and later one of the 17 Antiqua maneria of the Duchy of Cornwall. It included the whole of the parish of Creed and parts of other parishes.

Parish Church
The church of St Crida was of Norman foundation but in its existing form is more or less of the 15th century (the tower which had already been built in 1447 however was rebuilt in 1734). Between 1869 and 1906 the church was unused. It has a tower of three stages, a fine south aisle and a south porch. Parts of the old woodwork have been preserved. By 1291 the church was cruciform; of this the north transept and some masonry in the north wall remain. In the mid 15th century the south transept was replaced by an ambitious south aisle, with lavish windows, and an unusually rich south porch. Features of interest include the 15th century wagon roof of the south aisle, a Norman pillar piscina, the 13th century Catacleuse stone font, and the chest tomb of Thomas and Margaret Denys (died 1589 & 1578).

The church is covered in natural Cornish slating on the north and south slopes of the roof, with a ridge on the north chapel and south aisle. The south porch is provided with a hog's back unglazed natural clay ridge tile. The roof has no Coping stone or Cross finials.  The roof of the tower is unusually formed of Copper sheeting welted with a fleet to the gully on the north side of the tower. The tower is decorated with carved crotcheted granite pinnacles.

William Gregor, the discoverer of titanium, was rector here. Dr. Reginald Merther-derwa was Rector 1423-47; his will provided for the erection of a series of stone crosses at Camborne. The five similar stone crosses in Creed parish, including one now at Grampound church, may also have been due to him. Merther-derwa's will says "New stone crosses to be put up of the usual kind in those parts of Cornwall from Kayar Reslasek to Camborne church where dead bodies are rested on the way to their burial, that prayers may be made and the bearers take some rest". As there are no Gothic stone crosses in Camborne or adjacent parishes it is likely that these crosses were set up at Creed instead. In Creed parish there are the remains of four 15th-century crosses, three of which were cut from Pentewan stone. The market cross of Grampound is more ornate than the other three crosses. Fair Cross is a Gothic cross shaft. Nancor Cross has a cross head which was found in the 1920s near Nancor Farm; it was later set on a new shaft and erected beside the A390 road. In 1995 it was broken into four pieces but repaired in 1996. The fourth cross consists only of a cross base at Creed Lane.

References

Further reading

Anderson, William (1983) Holy Places of the British Isles; pp. 7–10: "The view from Creed Hill". London: Ebury Press 

Hamlets in Cornwall